Herohalli is a census town in Bangalore district in the Indian state of Karnataka.

Demographics 
 India census, Herohalli had a population of 18,066. Males constitute 53% of the population and females 47%. Herohalli has an average literacy rate of 72%, higher than the national average of 59.5%: male literacy is 78%, and female literacy is 65%. In Herohalli, 13% of the population is under 6 years of age.

References 

Cities and towns in Bangalore Urban district